Cora boleslia is a species of basidiolichen in the family Hygrophoraceae. It was formally described as a new species in 2016 by Robert Lücking, Eduardo Morales, and Manuela Dal Forno. The specific epithet boleslia refers to the type locality in Bolivia as well as the second name of mycologist David Leslie Hawksworth. The lichen is known to occur only in mountainous rainforests of the central Andes, where it grows on twigs in partial shade.

References

boleslia
Lichen species
Lichens described in 2016
Lichens of South America
Taxa named by Robert Lücking
Basidiolichens